The CSS Beaufort was an iron-hull gunboat that served in North Carolina and Virginia during the Civil War.

The Beaufort was originally called the Caledonia.  She was built at the Pusey & Jones Company of Wilmington, Delaware in 1854. The Caledonia operated out of Edenton, North Carolina. (Lytle 1975: 28)  In 1856 her home port changed from Edenton to Plymouth.  At the outbreak of the American Civil War, the Caledonia, now renamed Beaufort, was put in commission at Norfolk, Virginia on July 9, 1861 by Lieutenant Robert C. Duvall, North Carolina Navy, and sailed immediately for New Bern, North Carolina. While en route she engaged the large steamer USS Albatross in an inconclusive battle off Oregon Inlet. (ORN 6: 21, 790ff)

After North Carolina seceded, Beaufort was turned over to the Confederate States Navy, and on September 9 Lieutenant William Harwar Parker, CSN, was placed in command. Thereafter she participated in the battles of Roanoke Island on February 7–8, 1862, and Elizabeth City, North Carolina two days later. Right before the battle of Elizabeth City Beaufort had to supply most of her crew to man Cobb's Point Battery on the south shore  of the Pasquotank River. Thus deprived, Parker ordered Beaufort to  escape via the Dismal Swamp Canal to Norfolk. (ORN 6: 596f)
 
In March the Beaufort was tender to CSS Virginia off Hampton Roads on March 8–9, 1862. In that battle Beaufort moved alongside the US frigate Congress to accept its surrender. Heavy rifle fire from the shoreline drove her away with several casualties. The Beaufort also caused heavy damage to the Minnesota before nightfall. (Parker 1985: 276ff)

From May 1862, Beaufort operated on the James River, her commander in November 1863 being Lieutenant William Sharp, CSN. Beaufort served until the evacuation of Richmond, Virginia on April 3, 1865 when she was captured and taken into the United States Navy, the only other Confederate naval vessel, besides the unfinished casemate ironclad , of the James River Squadron to fall unscathed into the hands of its captors. She was sold September 15, 1865. On October 31, 1865 she was redocumented as the Roanoke, and in 1878 converted into a barge.  Her ultimate fate is unknown.

Commanders 
The commanders of the CSS Beaufort were:

 Lieutenant Robert C. Duvall (1861–1862), North Carolina Navy
 Lieutenant William Harwar Parker (1862) CSN
 Lieutenant William Sharp (October 1863) CSN
 Lieutenant Edward J. Means (November 1863 – June 1864) CSN
 Lieutenant J. M. Gardner (June 1864) CSN
 Lieutenant William Pinckney Mason (October 1864) CSN
 Lieutenant Joseph W. Alexander (December 19, 1864 – February 1865) CSN
 Lieutenant George Henry Arledge (in charge February 12, 1865–) CSN

References

Sources
Alexander Crosby Brown, Notes on the Origins of Iron Shipbuilding in the United States, 1825–1861, Masters Thesis, College of William and Mary, Williamsburg, Virginia, 1951.
US Navy Department, Official records of the Union and Confederate Navies in the War of the Rebellion. Series I: Volume 6. Washington: Government Printing Office, 1894–1922.
Records of the Bureau of Marine Inspection and Navigation, Certificates of Enrollments issued at North Carolina Ports 1815–1911, Abstracts, Record Group 41, National Archives, Washington, DC.
William Parker, Recollections of a Naval Officer, Naval Institute Press, 1985.
William Lytle & Forrest Holdcamper, Merchant Steam Vessels of the United States, 1790–1868, Steamship Historical Society, New York, 1975.

Gunboats of the Confederate States Navy
Ships built by Pusey and Jones
1854 ships
Maritime incidents in April 1865